Christelle may refer to:
 Christelle Avomo (born 1992), pop singer from Gabon
 Christelle Bedran (born 2000), Lebanese footballer
 Christelle Bosker, South African Paralympic athlete
 Christelle Bulteau (born 1963), former French track and field athlete
 Christelle Chobet (born 1986), French rugby union player
 Christelle Ciari (born 1976), Japanese actress
 Christelle Cornil (born 1977), Belgian actress
 Christelle Daunay (born 1974), French long-distance runner
 Christelle d’Intorni (born 1985), French politician
 Christelle Diallo (born 1993), French basketball player
 Christelle Laura Douibi (born 1985), Algerian alpine skier
 Christelle Le Duff (born 1982), French rugby union player
 Christelle Ferrier-Bruneau (born 1979), French racing cyclist
 Christelle Guignard (born 1962), retired French alpine skier
 Christelle Lefranc (born 1980), French fashion model
 Christelle Mbila (born 1990), beauty queen from the Democratic Republic of the Congo
 Christelle N'Garsanet (born 1983), Ivorian professional basketball player
 Christelle Nana Tchoudjang (born 1989), Cameroonian volleyball player

Variations 
 Chrystelle Trump Bond, American dancer, choreographer, and dance historian

Christelle is derived from the Latin word "Christellux" known for "Kristel Salloum".